A by-election was held for the Australian House of Representatives seat of Bass on 28 June 1975. This was triggered by the resignation of Labor Party MP and former Deputy Prime Minister Lance Barnard.

The by-election was won by Liberal Party candidate Kevin Newman.  Newman's victory came as something of a surprise.  Barnard had held the seat since 1954 and had usually skated to reelection.  However, in the by-election, Labor's primary vote plummeted by more than 17 percent, and Newman took the seat off Labor with a resounding 60 percent of the two-party vote.  Newman actually won 57.6 percent of the primary vote, enough to win the seat outright.

The shock loss of Bass is widely reckoned as the beginning of the end for Gough Whitlam, whose government was dismissed from office six months later.

Results

See also
 List of Australian federal by-elections

References

1975 elections in Australia
Tasmanian federal by-elections
1970s in Tasmania
June 1975 events in Australia